Bodrum International Ballet Festival (Turkish: Uluslararası Bodrum Bale Festivali) is an annual international ballet festival held in the Turkish port city Bodrum. Organised by Turkish State Opera and Ballet since 2002, the festival takes place during summer, usually around July and August. Bodrum Castle and Theatre of Halicarnassus are the main event venues during the festival.

Both national and international ballet groups and performers such as Vienna State Ballet, Sukhishvili Georgian National Ballet, Svetlana Zakharova, and Alonzo King LINES Ballet have performed in the event since its beginning.

See also 

 Turkish State Opera and Ballet
 Bodrum
 List of festivals in Turkey

References

External links 

 Flyer of the 17th Bodrum International Ballet Festival

Ballet in Turkey
Festivals in Turkey
2002 establishments in Turkey
Festivals established in 2002
Summer events in Turkey